Sainte-Barbe is a municipality of Quebec, located within Le Haut-Saint-Laurent Regional County Municipality in the Montérégie administrative region. The population as of the Canada 2021 Census was 1,609.

Geography

Communities
The following locations reside within the municipality's boundaries:
Pointe-Biron – a residential area on the south shore of the Saint Lawrence River along Route 132.
Pointe-Lalonde – a residential area on the south shore of the Saint Lawrence River along Route 132.

Lakes & Rivers
The following waterways pass through or are situated within the municipality's boundaries:
Saint Lawrence River – situated at municipality's northern boundary.

Demographics

Population

Language

See also
 Le Haut-Saint-Laurent Regional County Municipality
 La Guerre River
 Saint-Louis River (Beauharnois)
 List of municipalities in Quebec

References

Incorporated places in Le Haut-Saint-Laurent Regional County Municipality
Quebec populated places on the Saint Lawrence River
Municipalities in Quebec